Grand Duke Nicholas Mikhailovich of Russia (26 April [O.S. 14 April] 1859 – 28 January 1919) was the eldest son of Grand Duke Michael Nikolaevich of Russia and a first cousin of Alexander III.

On 29 January 1919, Nicholas was moved to Peter and Paul Fortress in Petrograd, and in the early hours of the following day he was shot there by a firing squad, along with his brother, Grand Duke George Mikhailovich, and his cousins Grand Dukes Paul Alexandrovich and Dmitri Constantinovich.

According to historians Edvard Radzinsky, their executions had been ordered by Vladimir Lenin as retaliation for the recent summary executions of Karl Liebknecht and Rosa Luxemburg in Berlin, by Freikorps forces loyal to the Weimar Republic.

Honours and awards
 : Knight of the House Order of Fidelity, 1876
 : Grand Cross of the Order of the Württemberg Crown, 1876
  Kingdom of Prussia: Pour le Mérite (military), 19 November 1878
 : Grand Cross of the Ludwig Order, 10 March 1886
 : Grand Cross of the Legion of Honour, December 1894
 : Knight of the Order of the Elephant, 18 November 1897
 : Decoration of Honour for Arts and Sciences, 1908
 : Knight of the Order of the Seraphim, 12 May 1908

Ancestry

Bibliography

Alexander, Grand Duke of Russia, Once a Grand Duke, Cassell, London, 1932.
Chavchavadze, David, The Grand Dukes, Atlantic, 1989, 
Cockfield, Jamie H. White Crow: The Life and Times of the Grand Duke Nicholas Mikhailovich Romanov 1859–1919. Praeger, 2002, 
George, Grand Duchess of Russia, A Romanov Diary, Atlantic International Publications, 1988. 
Hall, Coryne, Little mother of Russia, Holmes & Meier Publishers, Inc, 2001. 
King, Greg, Wilson, Penny, Gilded Prism, Eurohistory, 2006, 
Troyat, Henri, Tolstoy ,Doubleday, 1967. 
Zeepvat, Charlotte, The Camera and the Tsars, Sutton Publishing, 2004, .

References

1859 births
1919 deaths
People from Pushkin, Saint Petersburg
People from Tsarskoselsky Uyezd
Russian grand dukes
House of Holstein-Gottorp-Romanov
Russian lepidopterists
Honorary members of the Saint Petersburg Academy of Sciences
Biologists from the Russian Empire
Russian military personnel of World War I
19th-century people from the Russian Empire
Murdered Russian royalty
People executed by Russia by firing squad
19th-century historians from the Russian Empire
20th-century Russian historians
19th-century scientists from the Russian Empire
20th-century Russian scientists
Recipients of the Order of St. George of the Fourth Degree
Recipients of the Pour le Mérite (military class)
Grand Croix of the Légion d'honneur
Executed royalty
Prisoners of the Peter and Paul Fortress
Burials in Saint Petersburg